Dilbar (Hindi: दिलबर) is a 1994 Bollywood action film directed by B. Krishna Rao starring Mamta Kulkarni, Suresh Oberoi and Kulbhushan Kharbanda. It had music by legends Laxmikant–Pyarelal.

Cast
 Mamta Kulkarni
 Rishikesh Raj
 Nawaz Khan
 Johnny Lever
 Suresh Oberoi
 Kulbhushan Kharbanda
 Laxmikant Berde
 Beena Banerjee
 Reema Lagoo
 Tanushree
 Gowri Khorana

Music
The music of this movie has been composed by the veteran composer duo Laxmikant–Pyarelal and all songs are written by Anand Bakshi.

References

External links
 

1994 films
1990s Hindi-language films
Indian action films
Films scored by Laxmikant–Pyarelal